Sinezona levigata is a species of minute sea snail, a marine gastropod mollusc or micromollusc in the family Scissurellidae, the little slit shells.

Description
This species differs from Sinezona brevis in the degree of sculpture. At first sight it would appear a very different shell, but when closely examining the sculpture, it is seen to be the same. The longitudinal ribs have greatly deteriorated in strength, whilst the spirals have gained. The body whorl descends much more rapidly than in Sinezona brevis, whilst the earlier whorls are smaller. This combination gives an entirely different appearance to the shell, which is further strengthened by the fact that the fasciole is very little longer than the foramen. The thin operculum is horny and multispiral.
The colour of the shell is cream. Dead shells are pure white.

Distribution
This marine species occurs off New Zealand.

References

 Powell A. W. B., New Zealand Mollusca, William Collins Publishers Ltd, Auckland, New Zealand 1979 
 Geiger D.L. (2012) Monograph of the little slit shells. Volume 1. Introduction, Scissurellidae. pp. 1-728. Volume 2. Anatomidae, Larocheidae, Depressizonidae, Sutilizonidae, Temnocinclidae. pp. 729–1291. Santa Barbara Museum of Natural History Monographs Number 7

External links
 

Scissurellidae
Gastropods of New Zealand
Gastropods described in 1927